Rashard T. Anderson (June 14, 1977 – July 13, 2022) was an American professional football player who was a cornerback for two seasons in the National Football League (NFL).  He played for the Carolina Panthers from 2000 to 2001. He played college football for the Jackson State Tigers.

Early life
Anderson was born in Forest, Mississippi, on June 14, 1977.  He attended Forest High School in his hometown.  He then studied at Jackson State University (JSU), where he played cornerback for the Tigers from 1996 to 1999.  He played a role in the Tigers winning the 1996 Southwestern Athletic Conference (SWAC) Championship and the 1999 SWAC Eastern Division title.  He was subsequently drafted by the Carolina Panthers in the first round (23rd overall selection) of the 2000 NFL Draft.  He and Sylvester Morris were the second pair from JSU to be selected in the first round of an NFL draft, after Walter Payton and Robert Brazile in 1975.

Professional career

Anderson was drafted in the first round of the 2000 NFL Draft. Anderson made his NFL debut with the Panthers on September 3, 2000, at the age of 23, in a 20–17 loss against the Washington Redskins.  In his first NFL season, Anderson appeared in 12 games and recorded 21 tackles.  He ended the 2001 season with 47 tackles and his only career interception in 15 games.  He also finished second in the NFL in fumble return yards (97) after Brian Urlacher and was tied for the most fumble return touchdowns (1).

Anderson was suspended for a year by the NFL on May 23, 2002, for violating the league's substance abuse policy.  The suspension was extended for the 2003 season after he failed to meet the requirements for reinstatement.  He was ultimately reinstated by the NFL following the 2003 season, and the Panthers immediately released him.  Anderson subsequently signed a contract with the Calgary Stampeders of the Canadian Football League in May 2005.  However, he was released the following month when the Stampeders cut their roster to the 40-player regular-season limit.

Later life
After retiring from professional football, Anderson was employed as a substitute teacher and was an assistant football coach at Callaway High School and Murrah High School in Jackson.  He was inducted into the JSU Sports Hall of Fame.

Anderson died from pancreatic cancer on July 13, 2022, at the age of 45.

References

1977 births
2022 deaths
21st-century African-American sportspeople
African-American players of American football
American football cornerbacks
Carolina Panthers players
Jackson State Tigers football players
People from Forest, Mississippi
Players of American football from Mississippi
Deaths from pancreatic cancer